Abulyaisovo (Äbüläyes) is a rural locality (a village) in Abulyaisovsky Selsoviet, Zianchurinsky District, Bashkortostan, Russia. The population was 265 as of 2010. There are 10 streets.

Geography 
Abulyaisovo is located 60 km south of Isyangulovo (the district's administrative centre) by road. Malinovka is the nearest rural locality.

Ethnicity 
The village is inhabited by Bashkirs.

References 

Rural localities in Zianchurinsky District